Celia Lorena Herrera de la Vega (born in Mazatlán, Sinaloa, Mexico), known professionally as Lorena Herrera, is a Mexican singer and actress.

Biography 
Lorena moved with her family to Mexico City, where she began a career as a fashion model. She became highly successful in Mexico, and gained an international reputation, posing for advertisements in Mexico and South America. As a model, she won the "Look of the Year" contest, awarded in Mexico. 

Lorena then began working in Mexico's low-budget films. She has been involved in more than fifty films since she began her career as an actress in soap operas.

She also has created six music albums, of which five are studio albums, and one is an album of remixes named Soy (Remix), released in 1997.

For her work in the motion picture and recording industries as well as television, Herrera's handprints were embedded onto the Paseo de las Luminarias in 2012.

Soap opera 
Lorena Herrera met producer Emilio Larrosa, who had Televisa connections. Larrosa gave her a chance to star in his telenovela production Muchachitas" ("Young Girls"), which was a huge hit across Latin America.

She was then hired to participate in the mega-hit telenovela Dos Mujeres, un Camino, where she played the mistress of a villain.

Herrera has since acted in many other telenovelas, including El Premio Mayor. She is also a singer, having released various Mexican music CDs and toured Mexico and the United States. She has been approached by Playboy Mexico to pose nude for that magazine (she appeared in the Mexican Playboy in the December 1987 issue, under the name "Bárbara Ferrat"). She has also released various calendars in which she assumed sensual poses, and she posed naked for Playboy again in March 2011 at 44 years of age.

On the Univision show El Gordo y la Flaca, Lorena shared a bathtub with "El Gordo", Raul De Molina.

She worked as the evil stepmother of Lola (Monserrat) in Lola...Erase Una Vez. She is the mother of Grettell Valdez which interprets Carlota in Lola and she is also the mother of Zoraida Gomez in the soap opera Lola.

She has said that she likes singing, but acting is her favorite activity.

She has worked with Carla Estrada, Emilio Larosa, Pedro Damian and other producers.

She said recently on the Mentiras y Verdades show that she did not like to make novelas with Emilio Larrosa after El Premio Mayor told her that her part was going to be the antagonist.

Telenovelas

Filmography
 1993 Amargo destino

Discography

Soy (1996)
"Tri Tri"
"Soy"
"Olvidate"
"Los Pecados De Amor" (Single)
"Oh Yeah!"
"Pim Pam Pum"
"Esa Soy Yo"
"Corazonadas"
"Yo Vivire"
"Soy Remix"

Soy Remix (1997)

Desnudame El Alma (2000)
 "Ritmo Tequila"
 "Nunca Dejaré de Amarte"
 "Desnudame El Alma"
 "Despacito"
 "Dame Amor"
 "Sienteme"
 "Eo Deséo"
 "Más Allá Del Mómento"
 "El Amor Que No Tiene Rival"
 "Los Magos de La Noche"

Sobrevivire (2003)
 "Sobreviviré"
 "Que Culpa Tengo Yo"
 "Dejame"
 "Mi Amor Por Ti"
 "Como La Flor"
 "Eres Mi Todo"
 "Que No Quede Huella"
 "De Que Me Sirve"
 "Obsesion"
 "Abrazame"
 "Abrazame (Jota Remix)"

Aqui Estoy (2005)
 "Aquí Estoy"
 "Déjame"
 "Amame"
 "Abrazando Tu Recuerdo"
 "Oro Molido"
 "Callaré"
 "Vamos a Darnos Tiempo"
 "Envidia Me Da"
 "Recuerdos"
 "Baila Mi Ritmo"

Desnudame El Alma (2009)
 "Desnudame El Alma"
 "Gritaremos Ante el Mundo"
 "Chica Espacial"
 "Sobredosis"
 "Ya"
 "Sexy Lover"
 "Sexy"
 "Dame Amor [Version en Espanol]"
 "Solo Quiero"
 "Dentro de Ti"

Masoquista Single (2015)

Flash Single (2015)
 "Flash (Versión Original)"
 "Flash (Versión NEIKO)"

Plastik Single (2016)

Karma Single (2016)
 "Karma"
 "Soy (Versión 2016)"

FREAK Single (2017)

TÓCAME Single (2018)

SOY LA MÁS Single (2018)

References 

Lorena Herrera from Televisa Website
 Lorena Herrera on Myspace
 

Living people
Mexican telenovela actresses
Mexican film actresses
Actresses from Sinaloa
Mexican women singers
Mexican female models
Mexican television personalities
Mexican vedettes
20th-century Mexican actresses
21st-century Mexican actresses
People from Mazatlán
Year of birth missing (living people)
Mexican LGBT rights activists